Klaas-Jan Jeroen van Noortwijk (born 10 July 1970) is a former Dutch cricketer. He is a right-handed batsman and a right-arm medium-pace bowler.

Domestic career
He started playing cricket at VOC in Rotterdam when he was 8 years old. A back injury prevented him from pursuing a bowling-career, but gave him the opportunity to concentrate on his batting. He made his debut at the age of 23 and played for the Netherlands for 9 years. He was a strong performer in important matches.

International career
van Noortwijk held the record for the highest individual score for the Netherlands in a One Day International, having scored an unbeaten 134 against Namibia at the 2003 World Cup. His record was beaten by Wesley Barresi in 2014.

After cricket
Currently, He is a math teacher in the dutch school of Het Kennemer Lyceum.

References

External links

1970 births
Living people
Dutch cricketers
Netherlands One Day International cricketers
Sportspeople from Rotterdam